Four U.S. Navy ships have been named USS Scranton:

 , a transport that served in the U.S. Navy from 1918 to 1919. Both before and after this service, she served as the merchant steamer .
 Scranton (PF-63), a  renamed  on 28 June 1944, five months after she was launched
 USS Scranton (CA-138), an  laid down on 27 December 1944; construction canceled on 12 August 1945 and unlaunched hull was scrapped on the slipway
 , a  commissioned in 1991; presently in service 

United States Navy ship names